In the United States Navy, light cruisers have had the hull classification symbol CL. Both heavy cruisers (CA) and light cruisers were numbered in a single sequence after 1931, hence there are some missing hull numbers.

United States
Cruisers, light lists